Star Wars: Knight Errant is a 2010 novel and comic book series set in the fictional Star Wars universe, written by John Jackson Miller.  The comic series is the successor to the Star Wars: Knights of the Old Republic series that was published by Dark Horse Comics and which ran for 50 issues.  The story is set at the beginning of the Old Republic, 1000 years before the birth of Luke Skywalker, when the evil Sith lords still control large portions of the galaxy, and details the exploits of Kerra Holt, a young Jedi Knight who is attempting to fight against the Sith.

Comics
In February 2010, the Knights of the Old Republic comic series ended with issue #50.  In August 2010, Dark Horse Comics distributed a preview issue for a new series, Star Wars: Knight Errant at Star Wars Celebration V.  The new series was to be written by John Jackson Miller, who had written for the Knights of the Old Republic series and had also written the Lost Tribe of the Sith series of e-book novellas.  The first issue of Knight Errant was published in October 2010.  The series is being edited by Dave Marshall and pencilled by Frederico Dallocchio and Ivan Rodriguez.

Plot summary
The protagonist of the series is Kerra Holt, a young female human who has just become a Jedi Knight.  The Old Republic has been stretched to the breaking point and much of the galaxy is still controlled by Sith Lords, who are at war with both the Republic and, in many cases, with each other.  In the first story arc Aflame which ran in issues #1-5, Holt is sent behind enemy lines into Sith-controlled space on her very first mission for the Republic.

She soon finds herself on her own, with no support from the Republic, on a world called Chelloa.  A group of miners there are being oppressed by a Sith Lord, and she tries to help them.  She inadvertently sparks a war between the oppressive Sith Lord and his brother, and the planet is almost destroyed; however, she is able to save it.

Issues

Knight Errant #1: Aflame, Part 1 of 5 (Color 40 Pages, Oct 2010) $2.99
Knight Errant #2: Aflame, Part 2 of 5 (Color 40 Pages, Nov 2010) $2.99
Knight Errant #3: Aflame, Part 3 of 5 (Color 40 Pages, Dec 2010) $2.99
Knight Errant #4: Aflame, Part 4 of 5 (Color 40 Pages, Jan 2011) $2.99
Knight Errant #5: Aflame, Part 5 of 5 (Color 40 Pages, Feb 2011) $2.99
Knight Errant #6: Deluge, Part 1 of 5 (Color 40 Pages, Aug 2011) $3.50
Knight Errant #7: Deluge, Part 2 of 5 (Color 40 Pages, Sep 2011) $3.50
Knight Errant #8: Deluge, Part 3 of 5 (Color 40 Pages, Oct 2011) $3.50
Knight Errant #9: Deluge, Part 4 of 5 (Color 32 Pages, Nov 2011) $3.50
Knight Errant #10: Deluge, Part 5 of 5 (Color 40 Pages, Dec 2011) $3.50
Knight Errant #11: Escape, Part 1 of 5 (Color 32 Pages, Jun 2012) $3.50
Knight Errant #12: Escape, Part 2 of 5 (Color 32 Pages, Jul 2012) $3.50
Knight Errant #13: Escape, Part 3 of 5 (Color 32 Pages, Aug 2012) $3.50
Knight Errant #14: Escape, Part 4 of 5 (Color 32 Pages, Sep 2012) $3.50
Knight Errant #15: Escape, Part 5 of 5 (Color 32 Pages, Oct 2012) $3.50

Trade Paperbacks

Aflame.....(#s 1-5) - $17.99
Deluge.....(#s 6-10) - $18.99
Escape.....(#s 11-15) - $18.99

Novel
A companion novel with the same name, also written by John Jackson Miller. was published by Del Rey on January 25, 2011.

This novel is set a few weeks after the events of Aflame.

References

2010 comics debuts
2012 comics endings
2011 novels
2011 science fiction novels
Jedi
Star Wars Legends novels
Comics based on Star Wars